Disinformation Fix is the discography compilation album by Usurp Synapse, which was released as a double disc compact disc through the New York label Alone Records on July 29, 2003. The album collects every single recording made by the group during their initial run, including previously unreleased tracks.

Background
Usurp Synapse formed in 1998 in Lafayette, Indiana by guitarists Brandon Harris and Dean Duval, bassist Dustin Redington, vocalist John Scott and Travis Chance. Both Duval and Redington would leave the group that following year, being replaced by guitarist Don Kirkland and bassist Tony Dryer, respectively. That same year, vocalist Antonio Leiriao joined the group. Leoriao previously lived in New York before he moved out to Indiana to join the band. The group's discography mostly consists of split extended plays, and the group has done splits with bands such as Hassan I Sabbah, Neil Perry, Index For Potential Suicide, Jeromes Dream, among others. The band went through with a single nationwide tour with Jeromes Dream and Racebannon during the summer of 2000 before they began production on what was supposed to be their first full-length album, ATM Diatribe. Production for ATM Diatribe began in early 2001. Around that same time, the group added keyboardist Mike Dixon to their line-up. By May 2001, however, the group broke-up, partially due to financial conflicts, leaving the album unfinished with the exception of six recorded songs. These six tracks, along with other unreleased recordings as well as the rest of the band's discography, would later be released as a two-disc compilation album by Alone Records in 2003 titled Disinformation Fix.

Track listing

Notes
The official track listing according to the liner notes are wrong. For example, disc 2, track 6 is labeled as "Fuck You Mankind", while the track itself is actually "Meryl Streep Is A Fucking Liar". The track list above is the corrected track list.
Although disc 2, tracks 15 through 17 are previously unreleased, the liner notes say that they are from This Endless Breath, when really This Endless Breath did not include them. This suggests that they were recorded during the same sessions as the album. The same applies to disc 2, tracks 22 to 29, where the liner notes state that they were from the band's Index of Isolation split with Emotion Zero.

Personnel
Brandon Harris – guitar
Dean Duval – guitar
Don Kirkland – guitar
Dustin Redington – bass
John Scott – vocals, keyboards
Mike Dixon – keyboards, recording
Tony Dryer – bass
Travis Chance – drums
Antonio Leiriao – vocals
Brian Wyrick – design

References

External links
 Disinformation Fix on Discogs

2003 compilation albums
Usurp Synapse albums